The North African Tri Nations is an annual rugby union tournament involving nations from North Africa, organised by Rugby Africa, under hospices of World Rugby. Morocco won this first edition.

History
The tournament was first held in December 2016 organized by the Algerian Rugby Federation in collaboration with Rugby Africa grouping Algeria, Morocco and Tunisia. World Rugby has validated it, and the event take place at Oran, Algeria.

Results

Tournaments
Below is a list of previous tournaments results:

 A round-robin tournament determined the final standings.

Team records
The overall record of the teams are as follows:

Performance of nations

Legend

 — Champions
 — Runners-up
 — Third place

 — withdrew
 — Hosts

References

External links
Le premier Tri Nations du Maghreb - World Rugby official website

 
Rugby union competitions in Africa for national teams
Morocco national rugby union team
Tunisia national rugby union team
Recurring sporting events established in 2016
2016 establishments in Africa